Bio Base Europe is an innovation and training center for the bio-based economy. It is a platform that supports the development of bio-based products such as bioplastics, biomaterials, bio-detergents, and bioenergy from renewable biomass resources. Its mission is to stimulate sustainable development and economic growth by facilitating R&D and training for bio-based process development. It consists of a Pilot Plant for the bio-based economy in the port of Ghent (Belgium) and a Training Center for the bio-based economy in Terneuzen (Netherlands).

History 
On December 12, 2008, Europe, Flanders and the Netherlands allocated 21 million euros to the Interreg IV project Bio Base Europe. Bio Base Europe is the largest Interreg project ever granted to the Dutch-Flemish border region. The founding fathers are Ghent Bio-Energy Valley and Bio Park Terneuzen. In 2009, Bio Base Europe was awarded the Sail of Papenburg prize for best innovative project by the Association of European Border Regions (AEBR).

Bio Base Europe Pilot Plant 

Bio Base Europe Pilot Plant is a pilot test facility for the bio-based economy built with the aim to close the gap between scientific feasibility and industrial application. It operates on multiple scales which allow the plant to host a range of equipment to scale up bio-based processes to industrial scale. 

Tests done in the pilot plant aim to assess operating costs and other specific strengths and weaknesses of new processes before costly, large-scale investments in production plant facilities are made. Bio Base Europe Pilot Plant has no industrial shareholders and operates according to the open innovation service model. Companies and research centers throughout the world that are active in the bio-based economy can access these facilities for their technological developments.

The processes done in the pilot plant can be divided into the following categories

1.	Bio-refining: Biomass fractionation and pretreatment

2.	Industrial biotechnology: Microorganisms and Enzymes

3.	Green chemistry: Performed in Reactors

4.	Downstream processing: Recovery of Products

In the bio-refining operations, biomass can be fractionated in its various parts. These operations involve A.O. milling and pulping, dispersion, homogenizing, physical separation such as centrifugation and decantation, filtration including dead end particulate filtration and cross flow membrane filtration. Biomass can also be pretreated prior to enzymatic hydrolysis, involving pulping and homogenization reactions, jet cooking, acid or alkaline treatment, steam explosion, etc. 

White or industrial biotechnology processes involves the use of microorganisms and their enzymes in so-called fermentation processes or biocatalytic reactions. Fermentations can be performed from a 1 to 15,000-liter scale and involve both batches, fed batches or continuous operations. Reactors for enzymatic reactions are present that can be used with either water of organic solvents.

Green chemistry is performed in explosion proof installations such as glass-lined chemical reactors (1 - 6,000 L scale) that are suited to perform under vacuum or under pressure. The Bio Base Europe Pilot Plant is also equipped with filter dryers for solvent extraction of liquids and solids.

Downstream processing for the recovery of pure products after biochemical or chemical conversion involves utilizing various equipment for extraction, evaporation, demineralization, ion exchange, carbon treatment, crystallization, spray drying, lyophilization, etc.

Continuous process lines can be built up by connecting unit operations with mobile positive and centrifugal pumps, heat exchangers, dosing pumps, flexible and fixed piping and instrumentation.

Bio Base Europe Training Center 

The Bio Base Europe Training Center is an educational exhibition center promoting the development of a sustainable bio-based economy. It offers general and company-specific training and connects closely with the market demand.

The Bio Base Europe Training Center works according to the one-stop-shop concept. The training center offers companies a wide range of trainings for their process operators and technical staff. For example, a training portfolio can be used by logging into a web-based learning management system. Furthermore, specific training and a full training program for technical staff are offered and support in hiring new process operators can be obtained. In addition, the Bio Base Europe Training Center is developing dynamic process simulators which can be used for the training of operators.

External links 
 Company website

References 

Bioenergy organizations
Biotechnology